Do or Die is the second album released by Gospel Gangstaz, issued in November 1995 on Holy Terra Records.  The album peaked at No. 24 on the Billboard Top Christian Albums chart.

Overview 
Do or Die was produced by Mr. Solo, Tik Tokk, DMG and Prodeje. Artists such as The Emotions also appeared upon the LP.

Track listing 
"Ghetto Sermon"- 2:10  
"O Double G's Go On"- 4:29  
"Maybe If"- 5:06  
"Y Cain't da Homiez Hear Me?" (Remix)- 6:29  
"Demon Killa"- 4:59  
"Do or Die"- 5:11  
"Gospel Gangsta Thang"- 4:21  
"Truth and Funk"- 4:15  
"West Coast Roc"- 3:34  
"Backslider"- 4:28  
"Anutha Gruuv Fo Sum Preachin"- 4:20

References 

1995 albums
Gospel Gangstaz albums
G-funk albums
Christian hip hop albums